Puchavičy (Puchavičy ,  Pukhavichi) is a village in Puchavičy District, Minsk Voblast, Belarus, capital of Puchavičy Selsoviet (Puchavičy Rural District).

History
In December 1926, 929 Jews lived in the village, 43 percent of the total population. The Germans occupied the town at the end of June 1941. The Jewish population were murdered in 1941.

References

Notable residents
Anatol Volny  - was a Belarusian artist, poet, writer and journalist.

Villages in Belarus
Holocaust locations in Belarus
Puchavičy (Minsk Region)